Lecontite (sodium ammonium sulfate dihydrate, with potassium substituting for some ammonium, typically about a fourth) is a sulfate mineral with the formula (NH4,K)NaSO4·2H2O.  It was found by John Lawrence LeConte in Las Piedras Cave in Honduras as a breakdown product of bat guano, including crystals up to an inch long and identified as a separate mineral by W.J. Taylor in 1858.  As of 1963 most natural specimens came from the same cave.

Lecontite can easily be synthesized by reacting ammonium sulfate with sodium sulfate in aqueous solution and crystallized.

References 

Ammonium minerals
Sodium minerals
Sulfate minerals
Orthorhombic minerals